The Seaway International Bridge is an international crossing connecting New York State, in the United States, Akwesasne Mohawk Territory, and the province of Ontario in Canada. It consists of the South and North Channel Bridges. The South Channel Bridge was opened in 1958, and spans the St. Lawrence Seaway. The North Channel Bridge, opened in 2014, connects the City of Cornwall in Ontario to Cornwall Island in Akwesasne Mohawk Territory.

The bridge is among the busiest on the Canada–United States border in the state of New York, with about two million crossings a year. It is jointly owned by the Federal Bridge Corporation (a Crown corporation of the Canadian federal government) and the Saint Lawrence Seaway Development Corporation (an agency of the United States Department of Transportation), and is operated by the Seaway International Bridge Corporation, which came under the control of the Federal Bridge Corporation from the Saint Lawrence Seaway Authority in 1998.

Previously known as the Cornwall-Massena International Bridge, the SIBC was a private bridge whose outstanding stock was purchased by the Saint Lawrence Seaway Authority (Canada) and the Saint Lawrence Seaway Development Corporation (U.S.) in 1957. It was incorporated in Canada five years later.

In 2000, the international border crossing that the Seaway International Bridge comprises was named the Three Nations Crossing, in recognition that it connects the Akwesasne Mohawk Territory, a self-governing nation, to the United States and Canada.

On January 24, 2014, the opening of a new lower-level bridge marked the official closing of the former high-level North Channel crossing of the Seaway International Bridge. This project was estimated to cost $75 million, entirely funded by the Government of Canada. It was announced in 2010 that the Government of Canada would be going forward with this project that would involve the construction of a new low-level bridge as well as the demolition of the Seaway International Bridge to ensure the longevity of the border crossing, assuring that the former bridge was still in safe driving condition. The high-level Seaway International Bridge was completely demolished in 2015. At the opening ceremony of the new bridge, the first person to make the crossing was Raymonde Champagne, who had also been the first person to cross the high-level bridge in 1962.

Border crossing

The Three Nations Crossing is the border crossing associated with the Seaway International Bridge. It was named in 2000, in honor of the Mohawk of Akwesasne, a federally recognized tribe in the United States and First Nation in Canada. Their reserve extends across the international border, in addition to that between Quebec and Ontario. Most of the land is in New York, United States.

See also
 List of crossings of the Saint Lawrence River
 Cornwall Island (Ontario)

References

External links
Seaway International Bridge Corporation

Road bridges in Ontario
Bridges over the Saint Lawrence River
Canada–United States bridges
Transport in Cornwall, Ontario
Bridges completed in 1958
Bridges completed in 1962
Road bridges in New York (state)
Toll bridges in New York (state)
Toll bridges in Canada
Truss bridges in the United States
Truss bridges in Canada